This is a list of computer programs that are used to model nanostructures at the levels of classical mechanics and quantum mechanics.

 Furiousatoms - a powerful software for molecular modelling and visualization
 Aionics.io - a powerful platform for nanoscale modelling
 Ascalaph Designer
 Atomistix ToolKit and Virtual NanoLab
 CoNTub
 CP2K
 CST Studio Suite
 Deneb – graphical user interface (GUI) for SIESTA, VASP, QE, etc., DFT calculation packages
 Exabyte.io - a cloud-native integrated platform for nanoscale modeling, supporting simulations at multiple scales, including Density Functional Theory and Molecular Dynamics
JCMsuite – a finite element analysis software for simulating optical properties of nanostructures
LAMMPS – Open source molecular dynamics code
MAPS - Graphical user interface to build complex systems (nanostructures, polymers, surfaces...), set up and analyze ab-initio (Quantum Espresso, VASP, Abinit, NWChem...) or classical (LAMMPS, Towhee) simulations
nanoHUB allows simulating geometry, electronic properties and electrical transport phenomena in various nanostructures
Ninithi – carbon nanotube, graphene, and Fullerene modelling software
 Nanoengineer-1 – developed by company Nanorex, but the website doesn't work, may be unavailable
 NEMO 3-D – enables multi-million atom electronic structure simulations in empirical tight binding; open source; an educational version is on nanoHUB and Quantum Dot Lab
 Nanotube Modeler
 Materials Design MedeA
 Materials Studio
 Materials Square - a cloud-based materials simulation web platform, provides GUI for Quantum Espresso, LAMMPS, and Open Calphad
 MBN Explorer and MBN Studio
 MD-kMC
PARCAS – Open source molecular dynamics code
 SAMSON: interactive carbon nanotube modeling and simulation
 Scigress
 TubeASP
 Tubegen
 Wrapping

See also

References

Molecular modelling software
Carbon nanotubes
Materials science